Bertmainius pandus is a spider in the family Migidae, and genus Bertmainius. It was first described in 2015 by Mark Harvey, Barbara York Main, Michael Rix and Steven Cooper, and is endemic to south-western Australia.

References

Migidae
Spiders of Australia
Spiders described in 2015